Bully (alternatively titled Bully: The Musical) is a 2017 musical featurette written and directed by Aaron Alon and produced by Thunderclap Productions. Bully is a dramatic musical about Sam Bradley, a young man who kills himself after being repeatedly bullied in school because others suspect he is gay. The story follows Sam in the days leading up to his death and the lives of those around him in the days following his suicide.

Bully premiered in the United States on September 24, 2017, at Alamo Drafthouse – Mason Park in Houston, Texas. The film had its film festival premiere in the 2018 Rainier Independent Film Festival in Ashford, Washington, on May 20, 2018.

Synopsis 
The film tells the story of Sam Bradley, a young man who commits suicide after being bullied in school.

Cast 

 Edward Henrickson as Sam Bradley, a 14-year-old being bullied in school
 Danica Dawn Johnson as Mrs. Bradley, Sam's mother
 Brad Goertz as Mr. Bradley, Sam's father
 Kiefer Slaton as Tommy Samson, a bully at Sam's school with an abusive father
 Chelsea Lerner as Mrs. Samson, Tommy's mother
 Steve Hale as Mr. Samson, Tommy's abusive father
 Reggie Choyce as Hunter Sikes, a bully at Sam's school whose parents are prone to violence toward one another
 Monica Davis as Mrs. Sikes, Hunter's mother
 Juan Sebastian Cruz as Chase Cruz, a bully at Sam's school whose mother suffers from an addiction to pain pills
 Amanda Passanante as Mrs. Cruz, Chase's mother
 M.E. Frazier, Jr. as Mr. Ross, the school guidance counselor at Sam's high school
 Nora Hahn as Principal Rutledge, the principal at Sam's high school
 Tamara Siler as the First Mourner, the person who starts the vigil for Sam
 Emma Hayden, Ragan Richardson, Michael J. Ross, and Taelon Stonecipher as the quartet in "It Gets Better," four people filming their "It Gets Better" stories in response to Sam's suicide

Songs

 "When" – performed by Danica Dawn Johnston and Brad Goertz (as Mrs. and Mr. Bradley); lyrics and music by Aaron Alon
 "The Bullies' Song" – performed by Reggie Choyce, Kiefer Slaton, and Juan Sebastian Cruz (as Hunter, Tommy, and Chase); lyrics and music by Aaron Alon
 "Hunter's Song" – performed by Reggie Choyce (as Hunter); lyrics and music by Aaron Alon
 "Start Raising Men" – performed by Steve Hale (as Mr. Samson); lyrics and music by Aaron Alon
 "It Gets Better" – performed by Emma Hayden, Ragan Richardson, Michael J. Ross, and Taelon Stonecipher (as themselves); lyrics and music by Aaron Alon
 "Hollow House" – performed by Julian A. Puerto; lyrics and music by Aaron Alon
 "He's a Child" – performed by Monica Davis and Amanda Passanante (as Mrs. Sikes and Mrs. Cruz); lyrics and music by Aaron Alon
 "Who's Next" – performed by M.E. Frazier, Jr. (as Mr. Ross) with Tristan Smith on jazz guitar; lyrics and music by Aaron Alon
 "The Bullies' Song - Reprise" – performed by Reggie Choyce, Kiefer Slaton, and Juan Sebastian Cruz (as Hunter, Tommy, and Chase); lyrics and music by Aaron Alon
 "Raise Your Voice" – performed by Tamara Siler and company (as themselves); lyrics and music by Aaron Alon
 "Was" – performed by Danica Dawn Johnston (as Mrs. Bradley); lyrics and music by Aaron Alon
 "The More It Bleeds" – performed by Patrick Barton, Amy Garner Buchanan, William Sanders, Karen Schlag, Haley Simpson, and company (as themselves); lyrics and music by Aaron Alon
 "Did He Think" – performed by Brad Goertz (as Mr. Bradley); lyrics and music by Aaron Alon

Release 
Bully premiered in the United States on September 24, 2017, at Alamo Drafthouse – Mason Park in Houston. The second screening occurred April 10, 2018, at the University of Houston. The film had its film festival premiere in the 2018 Rainier Independent Film Festival in Ashford, Washington on May 20, 2018.

Official selections
Bully has been selected for screening at the following festivals and events:

 Cinema Diverse: the Palm Springs Gay and Lesbian Film Festival (2018)
Cult Critic Movie Awards (2018)
 Depth of Field International Film Festival (2018)
Eurasia International Monthly Film Festival (2018)
Filmfest Homochrom (2018)
Five Continents International Film Festival (2018)
 Fort Worth Indie Film Showcase (2018)
IndieFest (2018)
Indigo Moon Film Festival (2018)
 Lake View International Film Festival (2018)
Los Angeles Underground Film Forum (2018)
Next International Film Festival – NiFF Houston (2018)
Out of the Can Film Festival (2018)
PUSH! Film Festival (2018)
South Carolina Underground Film Festival (2018)
 Queer Hippo International LGBT Film Festival (2018)
 Rainer Independent Film Festival (2018)
 Thessaloniki International LGBTIQ Film Festival (2018)
 TMFF – The Monthly Film Festival (March–April 2018)
 UK Monthly Film Festival (2018)

Awards and nominations

Funding 
The film received grants from the Houston Art Alliance, the John Steven Kellett Foundation, the City of Houston, and donations from over fifty individuals.

See also 
 Suicide prevention
 Education in the United States

References

Further reading 
 BWW Interviews: Aaron Alon, Justin Doran, and Brad Goertz talk BULLY, A NEW MUSICAL and its Concept Cast Album
 Former Pearland resident's anti-bullying film to be screened in Katy

External links 
 
 

LGBT-related musical drama films
American musical drama films
American high school films
2017 LGBT-related films
Films set in Houston
Films shot in Houston
American LGBT-related films
Films about bullying
Films about gender
American independent films
2017 independent films
2010s English-language films
2010s American films